is a railway station on the Nishitetsu Tenjin Ōmuta Line located in Kurume, Fukuoka, Japan.

Layout 
The station has two side platforms serving two tracks on the ground level.

Adjacent stations

References

External links 
 Station information by Nishitetsu 

Railway stations in Japan opened in 1937
Railway stations in Fukuoka Prefecture